The 1661 English general election returned a majority of members in support of Charles II of England. This Parliament was called the Cavalier Parliament, since many of the MPs elected were former Cavaliers or the sons of Cavaliers.

Yet during the course of the Cavalier Parliament, there was considerable movement between the Cavaliers and the Roundheads.

See also
 List of MPs elected to the English Parliament in 1661

References

External links
 History of Parliament
 History of Parliament, Constituencies 1660–1690

17th-century elections in Europe
1661 in politics
1661
General election